Emmy Eugenie Andriesse (14 January 1914 in The Hague – 20 February 1953 in Amsterdam) was a Dutch photographer best known for her work with the Underground Camera group during World War II.

Early life and education
Emmy Andriesse was the only child of liberal Jews Abraham Andriesse and Else Fuld, both working in textile companies. At age fifteen, she lost her mother, and since her father traveled internationally for work, she was raised by several aunts.

From 1932 to 1937, after high school, Andriesse studied advertising design at the Academy of Fine Arts in The Hague founded in 1929 by designer . At the academy she belonged to a group of students around left-wing designer Paul Schuitema. She attended an experimental class taught by Paul Schuitema and Gerrit Kiljan, where she learnt photography and the use of photographs in posters, advertising and newspaper articles.  In her final years of study, she lived in Voorburg in a 'community house' together with a group of politically conscious fellow students. Amongst the 15 or so residents were photographer Hans Wolf and academics Eva Loeb, Hans Ijzerman and Lex Metz. In this environment Andriesse and her friends came into contact with International Red Aid and various anti-fascist artists' organizations. Andriesse was a member of Nederlandsche Vereeniging voor Ambachts- en Nijverheidskunst (V.A.N.K.) the Dutch Association for Craft and Craft Art.

War years and the 'Underground Camera' 
In June 1941 Andriesse married graphic designer and visual artist Dick Elffers (a gentile with whom she had two sons, one who died young), but as a Jew during the Nazi occupation Andriesse was no longer able to publish and she was forced into hiding. At the end of 1944, with the assistance of the anthropologist  she forged an identity card and re-engaged in everyday life, joining a group of photographers, including Cas Oorthuys and Charles Breijer, working clandestinely as De Ondergedoken Camera. The photos that Andriesse made under very difficult conditions of famine in Amsterdam, include Boy with pan, The Gravedigger and Kattenburg Children are documents of hunger, poverty and misery during the occupation in the "winter of hunger" of 1944-1945.

Post-war 
After the war, she became a fashion photographer and was an associate and mentor of Ed van der Elsken. Edward Steichen chose her 1947 portrait of a staid and elderly Dutch couple for the section 'we two form a multitude' in the Museum of Modern Art world-touring The Family of Man that was seen by an audience of 9 million. More recently (October 2006-January 2007) she was included in a display of Twentieth Century European photography at the Barbican Art Gallery, London.

Andriesse's last commission, the book The World of Van Gogh - published posthumously in 1953 - was not yet complete when she became ill and after a long battle with cancer, died at the age of 39.

At Harbor Island East in Amsterdam, the Emmy Andriessestraat is named after her.

References

Further reading

 Visser, Hripsime and Bool, Flip (1994). Emmy Andriesse (1914-1953). Focus Publishing, Amsterdam.
 *, Louise (1975) Emmy Andriesse - a profile in Emmy Andriesse Photographs 1944/52 (Exhibition catalogue) Rijksmuseum, Amsterdam
 Visser, Hripsimé (1984), essay in History of Dutch photography Alphen aan den Rijn
 30 April 1991 NOS broadcast television documentary Emmy Andriesse
 Baring, Louise (2013). "Emmy Andriesse - Hidden Lens". Schilt Publishing, Amsterdam.

External links

Biography (Dutch)
Photobook with biography (English)

1914 births
1953 deaths
Dutch people of World War II
Dutch resistance members
Photographers from The Hague
Dutch women photographers
20th-century Dutch women artists
20th-century Dutch photographers
20th-century women photographers